Beograd, uživo '97 – 1 (trans. Belgrade, Live '97 - 1) is the first disc of the fourth live album by Serbian and former Yugoslav rock band Riblja Čorba, released in 1997. Beograd, uživo '97 - 1 was followed by Beograd, uživo '97 - 2, as the band, instead of releasing a double live album, opted for two separate releases. Album was recorded on Riblja Čorba concert held on June 1, 1997 on Belgrade's Tašmajdan Stadium.

Track listing
"Zvezda potkrovlja i suterena" - 4:45
"Volim i ja vas" - 3:42
"Ljubomorko" - 3:57
"Gnjilane" - 7:51
"Priča o Džigi Bau" - 7:15
"Gastarbajterska pesma" - 7:37
"Baba Jula" - 4:51
"Danas nema mleka" - 5:48
"Jedino moje" - 5:19
"Neću da ispadnem životinja" - 4:29

Personnel
Bora Đorđević - vocals
Vidoja Božinović - guitar
Miša Aleksić - bass guitar
Vicko Milatović - drums
Vlada Barjaktarević - keyboards

References 

Beograd, uživo '97 – 1 at Discogs
 EX YU ROCK enciklopedija 1960-2006,  Janjatović Petar;  
 Riblja čorba,  Jakovljević Mirko;

External links 
Beograd, uživo '97 – 1 at Discogs

Riblja Čorba live albums
1997 live albums
Hi-Fi Centar live albums